The International Union of Pure and Applied Chemistry (IUPAC) has published four sets of rules to standardize chemical nomenclature.

There are two main areas:
 IUPAC nomenclature of inorganic chemistry (Red Book)
 IUPAC nomenclature of organic chemistry (Blue Book)

Use 
IUPAC nomenclature is used for the naming of chemical compounds, based on their chemical composition and their structure. For example, one can deduce that 1-chloropropane has a Chlorine atom on the first carbon in the 3-carbon propane chain.

History 
“Well being” of standardizing science by the nomenclature of scientific terms, measurements, and symbols was one of the primary reasons as to the founding of the organization. Before the creation of IUPAC, many other nomenclatures were proposed. The Geneva Nomenclature of 1892 was created as a result of many other meetings in the past, the first of which was established in 1860 by August Kekulé. Another entity called the International Association of Chemical Societies (IACS) existed, and on 1911, gave vital propositions the new one should address:

 Nomenclature of inorganic and organic chemistry;
 Standardization of atomic weights;
 Standardization of physical constants;
 Editing tables of properties of matter;
 Establishing a commission for the review of work;
 Standardization of the formats of publications;
 Measures required to prevent repetition of the same papers.

In 1919, a group of chemists created the IUPAC with this idea, as well as the purpose of unionizing scientists and strengthening the international trade of science. IUPAC celebrated its 100th anniversary in 2019 and continues to regulate scientific terminology today.

See also
Preferred IUPAC name
IUPAC books

References